Dumb Patrol is a 1931 one-reel short subject, part of the Looney Tunes series. It was released in May 1931 and is directed by Hugh Harman and Rudolf Ising. The film score was composed by Frank Marsales.

This cartoon shares its name with Dumb Patrol (1964), a Bugs Bunny and Yosemite Sam cartoon (also part of the Looney Tunes series) which was directed by Gerry Chiniquy.

Plot

Bosko, depicted as a pilot in World War I, battles a thuggish pilot and is shot down by the enemy pilot's massive cannon. He lands in the wreck of a home, where he meets Honey. He plays the piano to impress her, but is heard by the enemy pilot. The pilot attempts to shoot him; however Bosko constructs a plane himself and shoots down his enemy.
The reference of at least the second part of the short is to the 1918 film by Charles Chaplin "Shoulder Arms" in which Chaplin enters in the same wreck of a home where he meets Edna Purviance.

References

External links
 

1931 films
1931 animated films
1930s American animated films
1930s animated short films
Films scored by Frank Marsales
Films directed by Hugh Harman
Films directed by Rudolf Ising
Bosko films
Looney Tunes shorts
World War I aviation films